Chiloé National Park is a national park of Chile, located in the western coast of Chiloé Island, in Los Lagos Region (region of the lakes). It encompasses an area of  divided into two main sectors: the smallest, called Chepu, is in the commune of Ancud, whereas the rest, called Anay, is in the communes of Dalcahue, Castro and Chonchi. The greater portion of the Park is in the foothills of Chilean Coastal Range, known as the Cordillera del Piuchén. It includes zones of dunes, Valdivian temperate rain forests, swamps, and peat bogs. It is located between 42° 07' and 42° 13' south latitude and between 73° 55' and 74° 09' west longitude (see ).

History
 

The park was created by Supreme Chilean Decree N° 734, in 1982.

Climate 

Flora
The predominant vegetation is that of the Valdivian forest, a dense forest formed by perennial trees, shrubs and climbing plants. The rainforests are made up of evergreen southern beech (Nothofagus), and some native conifers, including the magnificent alerce (Fitzroya cupressoides). Extensive bogs and swamps are found in the hills. The Chilean rhubarb is also very common.

Fauna
The feature that made the island of Chiloe and the Gulf of Corcovado world-famous is the presence of local population of pygmy blue whales (The Cetacean Conservation Center carries out the Blue Whale Project). There are only 4 or more known forging grounds of them and blue whales in Southern Hemisphere including Chiloe region. In this area, it is notable that whales often enter into narrow fiords either to feed or rest. This area is also an important habitats for other whale species such as humpbacks, finbacks, seis, and possibly for critically endangered, only around 30 animals-remaining Peru/Chilean stock of southern right whales as well. Whales can also be observed close to shore in southern side of the island, such as near Caleta Zorra.

References

Sources
Translated from the Spanish site (see interwiki link).
Parque Nacional Chiloe

Protected areas of Los Lagos Region
Natural history of Chile
Chiloé Archipelago
Protected areas established in 1983
National parks of Chile
Valdivian temperate rainforest